the Matches album 4, unreleased; graphics? title? or not needed? is the fourth studio album by The Matches; it comprises the final original studio recordings from The Matches prior to their hiatus. Recorded at Talking House Productions studios, the bulk of the album was produced by John Paulsen, with two tracks produced by Miles Hurwitz. It was self-released to download and streaming services on August 12, 2009.

Release
The band released a message saying: After our hiatus announcement in July, we were surprised by the big wave of fans' comments (on myspace and various blogs and message boards) - very passionate, very disappointed, so we paid attention to
the pleas to put out unreleased songs and demos. We just finished pulling together and mastering this set of ten songs. They are very mint.

Track listing

References

The Matches albums
2009 compilation albums